The Mystery of Mr. Wong is a 1939 American mystery film directed by William Nigh and starring Boris Karloff.

The film is the second in the series of Mr. Wong.

Plot
A wealthy gem-collector, Brandon Edwards, gains possession of the largest star sapphire in the world, the 'Eye of the Daughter of the Moon', after it has been stolen in China. Edwards, at a party in his home, confides to Mr. Wong that his life is in danger. During a game of Charades (called "Indications" by Mrs. Edwards), Edwards is mysteriously shot dead and the gem disappears. Unbeknownst to Wong, the jewel is in possession of Edwards' maid, Drina, who intends to return it to China, but she too is murdered , and the gem is taken again. After one more murder—the suspect list is dwindling—Wong exposes the killer, turns him over to Police Inspector Street, and orders his manservant Willy to return the gem to China.

Cast
 Boris Karloff as James Lee Wong
 Grant Withers as Police Captain Sam Street
 Dorothy Tree as Valerie Edwards
 Craig Reynolds as Peter Harrison
 Ivan Lebedeff as Michael Strogonoff
 Holmes Herbert as Prof. Ed Janney
 Morgan Wallace as Brandon Edwards
 Lotus Long as Drina, the Maid
 Chester Gan as Sing, the Butler
 Hooper Atchley as Carslake
 Bruce Wong as Asian Man
 Jack Kennedy as Policeman
 Joe Devlin as George, the Detective
 Lee Tung Foo as Willie (as Lee Tong Foo), Wong's Butler and door opener.
 Wilbur Mack as Ballistics Expert
 Dick Morehead as police detective
 I. Stanford Jolley as Charades Player (uncredited)

See also
 Boris Karloff filmography

References

External links

 
 
 

1939 films
1939 mystery films
American black-and-white films
American mystery films
Films directed by William Nigh
American sequel films
Monogram Pictures films
Films set in San Francisco
1930s English-language films
1930s American films